Todoroki Arena is a multi-purpose indoor arena in the Todoroki Park in Kawasaki, Kanagawa, Japan. The capacity of the arena is 6,500 and was opened in 1995.

The arena is the playing ground for the Kawasaki Brave Thunders.

See also 
 Todoroki Athletics Stadium

Indoor arenas in Japan
Volleyball venues in Japan
Basketball venues in Japan
Sports venues in Kawasaki, Kanagawa
Sports venues completed in 1995
1995 establishments in Japan
Kawasaki Brave Thunders